Reginald Fisher may refer to:

 Reginald Fisher (cricketer) (1872–1939), English cricketer
 Reginald Brettauer Fisher (1907–1986), British biochemist
 Reg Fisher (1901–1958), Australian politician
 Reg Fisher (footballer) (1932–2011), Australian rules footballer
 Michael Fisher (Anglican bishop) (Reginald Lindsay Fisher, 1918–2003), Anglican bishop of St Germans